The siege of Kars was the last major operation of the Crimean War. In June 1855, attempting to alleviate pressure on the defence of Sevastopol, Emperor Alexander II ordered General Nikolay Muravyov to lead his troops against areas of Ottoman interest in Asia Minor. Uniting disparate contingents under his command into a strong corps of 25,725 soldiers, 96 light guns, Muravyov decided to attack Kars, the most important fortress of Eastern Anatolia.

Late in 1854, British General William Fenwick Williams had been sent to Kars to assess the situation and report directly to Lord Raglan (FitzRoy Somerset, 1st Baron Raglan), the commander-in-chief of the British expeditionary forces in the Crimea. Williams found the city in a deplorable state. The Ottoman forces included many newly-conscripted recruits, the men had not been paid in months and many had obsolete weapons. Support services such as hospitals were nonexistent. Many of the senior Ottoman officers were absent and lived in Istanbul. Morale was low and desertion high. Appalled by the situation, Williams took command along with several other foreign officers. He quickly set to work to institute discipline, train the troops and reinforce the city's defences. By the spring of 1855, 17,000 troops in high spirits stood ready to defend Kars.

The first attack was repulsed by the Ottoman garrison under Williams. Muravyov's second assault pushed the Turks back, and he took the main road and the heights over the city, but the renewed vigour of the Ottoman troops took the Russians by surprise. The ferocious fighting that had ensued made them change tactics and start a siege that would last until late November. Upon hearing news of the attack, Ottoman Commander Omar Pasha asked for Ottoman troops to be moved from the line at the siege of Sevastopol and redeployed to Asia Minor mainly with the idea of relieving Kars. After many delays, primarily put in place by Napoleon III, Omar Pasha left the Crimea for Sukhumi with 45,000 soldiers on 6 September.

Omar Pasha's arrival on the Black Sea coast north of Kars induced Muravyov to begin a third assault on the Ottoman forces, which had been nearly starved. On 29 September, the Russians undertook a general attack on Kars, which lasted seven hours with extreme desperation, but they were repulsed. General Williams remained isolated, however, as Omar Pasha never reached the city. Instead of relieving the garrison he plunged into prolonged warfare in Mingrelia and took Sukhumi in the aftermath. In the meantime, the Ottoman reserves in Kars were running out, and the supply lines had been thinned.

Heavy snowfall in late October made the Ottoman reinforcement of Kars quite impractical. Selim Pasha, Omar's son, landed another army at the ancient city of Trebizond, to the west, and began marching south to Erzerum to prevent the Russians from advancing further into Anatolia. The Russians sent a small force from the Kars lines to stop his advance and defeated the Ottomans at the River Ingur on 6 November.

The garrison of Kars declined to face further hardships of the winter siege and surrendered to General Muravyov on 28 November 1855, according to the Gregorian calendar. Muravyov was authorized by the tsar to change his name to "Muravyov-Karsky" to commemorate his part in taking the fortress. On entering the city the Russians "were immediately horrified to discover masses of men too weak to be evacuated, many of them in the throes of death". Despite the lack of aid from Istanbul, Williams remained steadfast to his Ottoman troops and stated that "they fell dead at their posts, in the tents, and throughout the camp, as brave men should who cling to their duty through the slightest glimmering of hope of saving a place entrusted to their custody".

Legacy 
 Namesake of Kars Street, Port Williams, Nova Scotia
 Namesake of Karsdale, Nova Scotia
 Namesake of Kars, New Brunswick
 Namesake of Kars, Ontario

See also

 Decline of the Ottoman Empire

References

The Siege of Kars 1855: Defence and Capitulation Reported by General Williams London: The Stationery Office, 200.

Kars
Kars 1855
Kars 1855
Conflicts in 1855
History of Kars